Darren Carlton Annon (born 17 February 1972 in Chelsea, England) is an English retired professional footballer. He made appearances in the Football League for Brentford, but played the majority of his career with non-League clubs Enfield, Farnborough Town and Margate.

Career

Carshalton Athletic 
A winger, Annon began his career at Isthmian League Premier Division club Carshalton Athletic and made his debut in October 1992. He made a handful of appearances during the 1992–93 season and established himself during the 1993–94 season, scoring 10 goals and attracting interest from Football League clubs. Annon departed the club in March 1994.

Brentford 
Annon's form for Carshalton earned him a £20,000 transfer to Second Division club Brentford in March 1994. He made 9 appearances in what remained of the 1993–94 season and scored his first Bees goal in a 3–1 defeat to Stockport County on 29 March. Annon made his first appearance of the 1994–95 season as a substitute for Lee Harvey in a 1–0 home defeat to Peterborough United on 20 August 1994. After featuring as an unused substitute in a 2–0 win over Rotherham United three games later, Annon found himself out of the first team squad until November, when Paul Stephenson suffered a double skull fracture in a match versus Bradford City on 2 November, which opened up a place in the team. Annon made his first start of the season in a Football League Trophy first round match against Gillingham on 8 November and celebrated his return to the team with the opening goal in a 3–1 victory. He started in the following game, an FA Cup first round match away to Cambridge United and scored the opening goal in a 2–2 draw.

Annon made his first league start of the 1994–95 season in a 2–1 victory over Brighton & Hove Albion on 26 November 1994, which kicked off a run of 10 consecutive appearances. He scored his third goal of the season in a 7–0 mauling of Plymouth Argyle at Griffin Park on 17 December. Annon's final appearance of the season came in a 2–1 victory over Hull City on 21 January 1995. After Paul Stephenson's return to fitness, Annon only received one more call into the first team during the season, featuring as an unused substitute in the return league game with Rotherham United on 18 March. Annon made 13 appearances during the 1994–95 season and scored three goals. Annon was out of favour during the 1995–96 season and made just one appearance, coming on as a substitute for Denny Mundee in a 2–0 defeat to league leaders Swindon Town on 2 September 1995. Annon departed the Bees in February 1996, after making 23 appearances and scoring five goals during his two years with the club.

Kingstonian 
Annon returned to the Isthmian League Premier Division to sign for Kingstonian in March 1996. During what remained of the 1995–96 season, he made seven appearances and scored three goals.

Enfield 
Annon signed for Isthmian League Premier Division club Enfield during the 1996 off-season. He had a successful 1996–97 season, though it ended in disappointment as the "Es" finished six points adrift of champions Yeovil Town, despite themselves finishing 28 points clear of third-place Sutton United. Annon featured in Enfield's run to the first round proper of the FA Cup during the 1998–99 season, taking Second Division club York City to a replay before being knocked out 2–1 at Bootham Crescent. The Es went one better in the 1999–00 season, defeating Second Division club Chesterfield 2–1 at Saltergate in the first round and taking Preston North End to a replay after a 0–0 draw at Deepdale in the second round. Featuring mostly as a defender, Annon made over 100 appearances for Enfield before departing at the end of the 1999–00 season.

Farnborough Town 
Annon joined Isthmian League Premier Division club Farnborough Town during the 2000 off-season. He was a virtual ever-present and scored his first goal for the club in a 3–2 league win over Harrow Borough on 24 March 2001. He had a successful first season, making 48 appearances and won the first silverware of his career, with Boro being crowned 2000–01 Isthmian League Premier Division champions and securing promotion to the Conference. Annon scored his first goal of the 2001–02 season in a 7–1 demolition of Portsmouth Royal Navy in the Hampshire Senior Cup on 7 November 2001. He was again a virtual ever-present, making 43 appearances and helping "Boro" to a 7th-place finish. Annon made 39 appearances during the 2002–03 season and the highlight came when Farnborough were drawn away to Premiership club Arsenal in the third round of the FA Cup, though "Boro" suffered a 5–1 defeat at Highbury. Annon won the Supporters' Player of the Year award and departed the club at the end of the 2002–03 season. He made 130 appearances and scored two goals during his three seasons with Farnborough.

Margate 
Annon signed for Conference club Margate in June 2003. He had a successful first season, making 49 appearances, scoring two goals and winning the Kent Senior Cup. Margate suffered demotion to the newly formed Conference South for the 2004–05 season and Annon was named as captain. He filled in at centre back and wing back throughout the early part of the season and his campaign was ended prematurely after he was stretchered off with a ruptured achilles tendon after five minutes of a 1–0 defeat to Hayes on 11 December 2004. He had made 26 appearances during the 2004–05 season, but despite the "Gate" suffering relegation to the Isthmian League Premier Division, they went on to win the Kent Senior Cup for the third season in succession. The length of Annon's recovery from the injury meant that he missed the start of the 2005–06 season, but he departed the club in October 2005 after returning to fitness. Annon made 75 appearances during his time with Margate and scored two goals.

Havant & Waterlooville 
Annon moved back up to the Conference South to sign for Havant & Waterlooville in October 2005. He made his debut away at Carshalton Athletic on 22 October, coming on as a half time substitute for Matt Gray in a 3–1 win. By November, Annon had established himself as a regular starter and made 30 appearances during the 2005–06 season. His season ended in disappointment after three-point deduction saw the Hawks miss out on a place in the playoffs. Annon was retained for the 2006–07 season, but injury problems restricted him to just 10 appearances. Annon made his only appearance of the 2007–08 season as a 77th-minute substitute for Jamie Collins in a 4–1 win over Hayes & Yeading United on 25 August 2007. Annon left the Hawks in February 2008 and made 41 appearances during his time with the club.

Redbridge 
Annon joined Isthmian League First Division North club Redbridge on a one-month loan on 21 December 2007. He made his debut in a 3–0 victory over Tilbury on 22 December. He helped the club to four wins in his four appearances and returned to Havant & Waterlooville after his loan expired. Annon signed permanently for Redbridge in February 2008. He made seven appearances during what remained of the 2007–08 season and helped the club to a 3rd-place finish and a playoff first round tie with Ware. The Motormen progressed to the playoff final, but were defeated by Canvey Island. Annon left the club after the season.

Tooting & Mitcham United 
Annon signed for Isthmian League Premier Division club Tooting & Mitcham United during the 2008 off-season. An injury suffered during pre-season kept him out of action at the beginning of the 2008–09 season and he left the club in December 2008 without making a competitive appearance.

Guildford City 
Annon joined Combined Counties League Premier Division club Guildford City in December 2008. He made his debut in a 4–3 victory over Cobham on 27 December. He managed only four appearances before departing the club in February 2009.

Banstead Athletic 
Annon moved across the Combined Counties League Premier Division to sign for Banstead Athletic in February 2009, making his debut in a 1–1 draw with Bedfont Green on 28 February. He stayed with the club until the end of the 2008–09 season, making 10 appearances. Annon retired from football at the end of the season.

Norton 
Annon came out of retirement to make 16 appearances for Surrey South Eastern Combination Junior First Division club Norton during the 2010–11 and 2011–12 seasons. He later made appearances for veterans club Livingstone RARA.

Personal life 
Annon works as a staff governor, teaching assistant, football coach at Macaulay CE Primary School in Clapham, London. He is also a youth coach at Clapham Rangers.

Career statistics

Honours 
Farnborough Town
Isthmian League Premier Division (1): 2000–01
Margate
 Kent Senior Cup (2): 2003–04, 2004–05

Individual

 Farnborough Town Supporters' Player of the Year (1): 2002–03

References

External links

1972 births
Living people
Footballers from Chelsea, London
English footballers
Association football defenders
Association football wingers
Carshalton Athletic F.C. players
Brentford F.C. players
Kingstonian F.C. players
Enfield F.C. players
Farnborough F.C. players
Margate F.C. players
Havant & Waterlooville F.C. players
Redbridge F.C. players
Tooting & Mitcham United F.C. players
English Football League players
National League (English football) players
Association football utility players
Guildford City F.C. players
Banstead Athletic F.C. players
Norton F.C. players
Isthmian League players